The BA-21 was an experimental Soviet armored car from 1938. It was a major modification of the BA-20, using a triaxial truck chassis instead of biaxial. The next year, the design was further developed into the LB-23, which had a better engine. Both vehicles were not accepted for production.

Specifications 
It had 11 mm (0.43 in) of armor, with a 7.62 in (0.3 in) DT machine gun. The vehicle was manned by a crew of two, consisting of a commander and a driver.

Development 
The BA-21 was designed in 1938, as a major modification of the BA-20. It used a triaxial truck chassis, instead of a biaxial truck chassis. In 1939, the BA-21 was developed further into the LB-23, which had a better engine than the original design. Both of the vehicles were not accepted for production.

References

Citations

Bibliography

Web sources 
 

Armoured cars of the interwar period
World War II armoured fighting vehicles of the Soviet Union
Reconnaissance vehicles
Military vehicles introduced in the 1930s